Georg Hoffmann (1880–1947) was a German freestyle, backstroke, breaststroke swimmer and diver who competed in the 1904 Summer Olympics and 1906 Intercalated Games.

Hoffmann competed in three events at the 1904 Summer Olympics in St. Louis, in the 100 yard backstroke there was only six swimmers and he finished in second place to win a silver medal behind fellow German Walter Brack, the next day he competed with three other swimmers in the 440 yard breaststroke and unfortunately came in last place. Hoffmann also competed in the controversial platform diving event, where he came second behind American George Sheldon but only after protesting claiming the German dives where more fancy than the Americans, and it was a week later until it was decided that the original result stood.

Two years later he was back on the Olympic scene competing at the 1906 Intercalated Games in Athens, he again competed in the platform diving event, and again he finished second this time behind another German, Gottlob Walz, he also competed in the 100 metres freestyle swimming event, but didn't come in the top five in his heat so didn't qualify for the final.

References

1880 births
1947 deaths
German male swimmers
German male divers
Olympic swimmers of Germany
Olympic divers of Germany
Olympic silver medalists for Germany
Olympic medalists in diving
Medalists at the 1904 Summer Olympics
Medalists at the 1906 Intercalated Games
Swimmers at the 1904 Summer Olympics
Swimmers at the 1906 Intercalated Games
Divers at the 1904 Summer Olympics
Divers at the 1906 Intercalated Games
Olympic silver medalists in swimming